Vere Henry Louis Foster (or Lewis) (25 April 1819 – 21 December 1900) was an English educationist and philanthropist.

Life
Born in Copenhagen on 25 April 1819, he was the third son of Sir Augustus John Foster, 1st Baronet and his wife, Albinia Jane (died 28 May 1867), daughter of George Vere Hobart, and granddaughter of George Hobart, 3rd Earl of Buckinghamshire. He was educated at Eton College, and matriculated at Christ Church, Oxford, on 30 May 1838.

Leaving Oxford without a degree, Foster joined the diplomatic service. From 1842 to 1843 he was attached to the diplomatic mission of Sir Henry Ellis in Rio de Janeiro, and from 1845 to 1847 to that of Sir William Gore Ouseley in Montevideo.

In 1847 Foster visited a family estate in County Louth, Ireland at the time of the Great Famine, with his eldest brother, Sir Frederick George Foster. They became involved in famine relief. In 1848 their father died, Vere Foster underwent a crisis in his life, and he came to concentrate on philanthropy in Ireland.

Foster made three voyages to the United States as a steerage passenger in a ship of emigrants, finding the accommodation bad, and the treatment of emigrants exploitative. Through his cousin Vere Hobart, Lord Hobart he was able to influence parliament, and the Passengers Act 1851. He also took practical steps to promote Irish emigration to the USA.

Later, Foster took up the improvement of education in Ireland. This was a time of Catholic suspicion of the national education system introduced by Richard Whately. Foster contributed to the provision of better school accommodation and apparatus, and gave grants in aid of building several hundred new school-houses.

In 1879, with the Land War in Ireland, Foster concentrated on promoting female emigration to the United States and the British colonies. Young women were assisted, numbering 18,000 in 1880–3. He was supported in his projects by both Catholic and Protestant clergy.

Foster died, unmarried, at Belfast on 21 December 1900. He was buried in Belfast City Cemetery.

Works
Foster was known also for a series of copybooks widely used in the United Kingdom, designed for Irish pupils:

 Elementary Drawing Copybooks, 1868. 
 Copybooks, 1870. 
 Drawing Copybooks, 1870. 
 Advanced Water-colour Drawing, 1872. 
 Public School Writing Copybooks, 1881. 
 Simple Lessons in Watercolour, 1883. 
 Drawing Books ... in Pencil and Watercolours, 1884.
 Painting for Beginners, 1884. 
 Upright Writing Charts, 1897.

In 1898 he edited, as The Two Duchesses, the family correspondence of Georgiana Cavendish, Duchess of Devonshire (1757–1806) and 
Elizabeth Cavendish, Duchess of Devonshire (1759–1824).

Further reading
Mary McNeill, Vere Foster, 1819–1900: An Irish Benefactor, Newton Abbot: David & Charles, 1971. "A publication of the Institute of Irish Studies, the Queen's University, Belfast."

References

Attribution

1819 births
1900 deaths
People educated at Eton College
Alumni of Christ Church, Oxford
English philanthropists
English educational theorists
19th-century British philanthropists
Burials at Belfast City Cemetery
Younger sons of baronets